Nusoncus is a monotypic genus of dwarf spiders containing the single species, Nusoncus nasutus. The genus was described by J. Wunderlich in 2008. It is considered new to the fauna of Latvia since 2009.

See also
 List of Linyphiidae species (I–P)

References

Linyphiidae
Monotypic Araneomorphae genera
Spiders of Europe